In the Netherlands, child pornography is illegal, making it one of the 103 out of 193 UN member states where it is illegal.

Dutch law referring to child pornography 
According to the Wetboek van Strafrecht:
 Article 240b, number 1 prohibits the production, distribution, possession and sale of child pornography, and gaining access to it by means of the Internet. Maximum imprisonment is 4 years or a fine of the fifth category (€ 78,000).
 Article 240b, number 2 prohibits committing crime, described under number 1 as a profession or as a habit. Maximum imprisonment is 8 years  or a fine of the fifth category (€ 78,000).
In the Netherlands, the definition of child pornography is: pictures (photos and videos) of sexual acts of someone that seems to be younger than 18 years.

Chick-arrest

In 1970, the publication of sex magazine Chick resulted in the Dutch "Chick-arrest" by the Supreme Court of the Netherlands, which in turn led to the new Dutch moral law of 1971 that no longer criminally sanctioned pornography. As a result, child pornography also became effectively legal and Joop Wilhelmus started publishing child pornography magazine Lolita.

1984 police raids
In 1984, a major police raid against child pornography occurred in the Netherlands. During the late 1970s, there had been media reports about the illicit trade, but there were few if any criminal investigations on the topic.

2002 legislation
On October 1, 2002, the Netherlands introduced legislation (Bulletin of Acts and Decrees 470) which deemed "virtual child pornography" as illegal. An attempt to test the law came in 2007, when the public prosecutor opened investigations into Second Life (the US based virtual world). A number of Second Life users engage in sexual ageplay where their online avatars dress, act and look like underage children while engaging in virtual sexual acts. Although there is no Dutch law that legislates against under age depictions of sexual acts for computer generated images, the public prosecutor is investigating this on the basis that these virtual actions may incite child abuse in the real world. So far this has not led to any successful prosecutions.

Significant rise in illegal websites
Press reports in 2008 described a large rise in the number of child pornography websites hosted in the Netherlands, increasing from 100 reports of sites in 2006 to 700 in 2007.

In 2020 the European Commission reported that in 2019 The Netherlands hosted 71% of the child sexual abuse material detected in Europe by the Internet Watch Foundation, an increase from 47% in 2018.

See also
 Laws regarding child pornography
 Child pornography laws in Portugal
 Child pornography laws in the United Kingdom
 Child pornography laws in Australia
 Child pornography laws in Canada
 Child pornography laws in the United States
 Child pornography laws in Japan

References

Netherlands
Law of the Netherlands
Childhood in the Netherlands